Eysarcoris is a genus of shield bugs belonging to the family Pentatomidae, subfamily Pentatominae.

Description 
Stink bugs of this genus are relatively small (<6 mm in length) and obovate in shape. There is a dense covering of punctures on much of the body. The head and the ventral surface of the thorax are covered with club-shaped hairs.

Eysarcoris belongs to a group of stink bugs (also including Sepontia, Spermatodes and Stagonomus) which have a broad scutellum and an auriculate/spine-like process anterior to the scent gland opening, and do not have a median sulcus in the thoracic sterna.

Ecology 
Eysarcoris are herbivores that live on various plants.

Some Eysarcoris are plant pests: E. guttiger is a pest of soybean and sesame, while E. trimaculatus and E. ventralis are pests of rice.

Research 
The mitochondrial genomes of various Eysarcoris species have been sequenced.

Species 

 Eysarcoris aeneus (Scopoli, 1763)
 Eysarcoris confusus Fuente, 1971
 Eysarcoris distinctus (Schouteden)
 Eysarcoris hispalensis Fuente, 1971
 Eysarcoris lereddii (Le Guillou)
 Eysarcoris luisae Fuente, 1971
 Eysarcoris perlatus Fabricius
 Eysarcoris uniformis Fuente, 1971
 Eysarcoris ventralis (Westwood, 1837) - white spotted bug

References

External links
 BioLib
 Fauna Europaea

Pentatomidae genera
Eysarcorini